Thomas, Tom or Tommy Reynolds may refer to:

Politics
Thomas Reynolds (Assemblyman), former member of the Wisconsin State Assembly
Thomas Reynolds (Australian politician) (1818–1875), Premier of South Australia, 1860–1861
Thomas Reynolds (governor) (1796–1844), governor of Missouri
Thomas Reynolds II (born 1954), member of the Mississippi House of Representatives
Thomas Caute Reynolds (1821–1887), Missouri's second Confederate governor
Thomas G. Reynolds (born 1956), former member of the Wisconsin Senate
Thomas M. Reynolds (born 1950), former congressman from the U.S. state of New York
Tom Reynolds (Australian politician) (born 1936), former member of the Victorian Legislative Assembly

Sportspeople
Tom Reynolds (American football) (born 1949), American football wide receiver
Tom Reynolds (footballer) (1917–2002), Australian footballer
Tom Reynolds (soccer) (born 1955), retired American soccer goalkeeper
Tommy Reynolds (footballer) (1922–1998), English footballer
Tommie Reynolds (born 1941), former Major League Baseball outfielder

Other people
Thomas Reynolds (bishop) (died 1560), English churchman and academic
Thomas Reynolds (minister) (1752–1829), English antiquarian and minister
Thomas Reynolds (priest) (1562–1642), English Reformation Catholic priest and martyr
Thomas Hedley Reynolds (1920–2009), president of Bates College, American historian
Tom Reynolds (actor) (1866–1942), British actor
Tom Reynolds (author) (born 1960), American author
Tom Reynolds (EMT) (born 1971), pen name used by London Ambulance Service technician and author Brian Kellet
Tommy Reynolds (musician), American jazz clarinetist and bandleader
Tommy Reynolds, multi-instrumentalist and vocalist with Hamilton, Joe Frank & Reynolds

See also
Thomas Reynold (disambiguation)